Dr Ashwani Mahajan is the National Co-Convener of Swadeshi Jagaran Manch (SJM), an Indian political and cultural organisation. SJM is affiliated with the Rashtriya Swayamsewak Sangh.

Biography
Mahajan worked as an author and columnist. He is Professor at PGDAV College, Delhi. Mahajan is Chief Editor of Journal of Contemporary Indian Polity and Economy since 2011. Mahajan is also a visiting professor and research guide at Pacific University, Udaipur and Mewar University. He works as a researcher and activist on World Trade Organization (WTO) and other international trade agreements, he has attended four ministerial conferences of WTO held at Geneva, Bali, Nairobi and Buenos Aires, as representative of Swadeshi Jagran Foundation, which is an accredited NGO with WTO.

Author
Mahajan is a writer on the economy of India. In 2014, he co-authored Datt & Sundaram's Indian Economy. Mahajan has published a number of articles in various national dailies and periodicals including Deccan Herald, The Statesman, Pioneer, The Excelsior, The Economic Times (India), Business Today, Organiser, Dainik Jagran (Hindi), Rajasthan Patrika (Hindi), Amar Ujala (Hindi) and Hindustan (Hindi). He has also published a number of research articles journals including Economic and Political Weekly, Mainstream, Indian Economic and Almanac.

Publications
 Datt & Sundharam Indian Economy with Gaurav Datt, (2014, revised 2016, S. Chand Group)  
 Bhartiya Arthvyavastha with Gaurav Datt, (2015, S. Chand Publishing, in Hindi)

Politics

Policy intervention
As National Co-Convener of Swadeshi Jagran Manch he has been instrumental changing in economic policies. His policy interventions include withdrawal of controversial ordinance on land acquisition, getting field trials of GM crops policy revisited, FDI policy of the government especially retail trade and e-commerce.

Views on development
A critique of globalisation, he believes that GDP growth-centric philosophy of development does not suit India. This model talks about the last men in the queue and favours integrating growth with employment generation.

He has been critical of foreign direct investment and ready to use therapeutic foods.
Mahajan is a staunch opponent of genetically modified (GM) seeds, has been running a campaign against permission to new GM seeds in India.

References

Living people
Academic staff of Delhi University
21st-century Indian economists
Year of birth missing (living people)